Robert “Bobby” Brennan is a retired American soccer defender who played professionally in the USL A-League.

Brennan attended American University.  He was a four-year starter.  However, he was forced to redshirt the 2000 season after dislocating his shoulder early in the season.  In February 2002, D.C. United selected Brennan in the fourth round (42nd overall) of the 2002 MLS SuperDraft.  D.C. United released him during the pre-season and Brennan signed with the Milwaukee Rampage of the USL A-League.  The Rampage won the 2002 A-League title.  In 2004, he played one game with the Long Island Rough Riders of the USL Premier Development League.

References

Living people
1979 births
Soccer players from New York (state)
American Eagles men's soccer players
D.C. United draft picks
Long Island Rough Riders players
Milwaukee Rampage players
A-League (1995–2004) players
USL League Two players
People from Northport, New York
American University alumni
Association football defenders
American soccer players